Henning Melber (born August 22, 1950 in Stuttgart ) is a German-Namibian Africanist and political activist.

Life
Melber grew up in Esslingen am Neckar and Leutkirch in Baden-Württemberg, Germany. He moved to Namibia in 1967 as a teenager, and graduated from the German High School of Windhoek. In 1974, he joined the SWAPO liberation movement. From 1975 to 1990, he was forbidden to enter Namibia. In the 1970s, Melber studied politics and sociology at the Free University of Berlin, and in 1977 he graduated as a diploma lecturer. 

He earned his PhD in 1980 from the University of Bremen with a work entitled "School and Colonialism". From 1982 to 1992 he was an assistant at the Department of Social Sciences at the University of Kassel. In 1993 he qualified as a professor at the University of Bremen. From 1992 to 2000 he was Head of the Namibian Economic Policy Research Unit (NEPRU) in Windhoek. From 1994 to 2000 he was Chairman of the Namibian-German Foundation for Cultural Cooperation in Windhoek. From 1996 to 1998 he was also chairman of the Association of Namibian Publishers (ANP). In 2000, he joined the Nordiska Afrikainstitutet in Uppsala, Sweden. After that, he headed the Swedish Dag Hammarskjöld Foundation from 2006 to 2012, which he is currently still in an advisory capacity.

Since 2012 Melber has been an extraordinary professor at the Institute of Political Science at the University of Pretoria in South Africa. Since 2013 he has also been an associate professor at the Center for Africa Studies at the University of the Free State in South Africa.

Since 2017 he is president of the European Association of Development Research and Training Institutes (EADI).

In 2018, Melber was ranked as a B2 scholar by the South African National Research Foundation, referring to his "considerable international recognition for the high quality and impact of [their] recent research outputs".

Publications
Melber has published numerous books and several hundred contributions on problems and the history of Namibia, as well as on other topics such as internationalism and racism:

School and Colonialism: The Formal Education of Namibia, Hamburg 1979.
The whiteness of the last conclusion: racism and colonial gaze. Brandes & Apsel, Frankfurt 1992,  .
Opportunities of international civil society. (with Reinhart Kößler) Suhrkamp, Frankfurt am Main 1993, .
A New Scramble for Africa? Imperialism, Investment and Development. (Eds., with Roger Southall) Scottsville, University of KwaZulu-Natal Press 2009, .
"The United Nations and Regional Challenges in Africa - 50 Years after Dag Hammarskjöld". (Eds., with Maxi Schoeman) In Development Dialogue, no.57, December 2011,  .
Understanding Namibia. Jacana Media, Cape Town 2014, . (Also Oxford University Press, London 2015).
Namibia - Socio-political explorations since independence. Brandes & Apsel, Frankfurt a. M. 2015,  .
Genocide - and then what? The policy of German-Namibian past processing. (with Reinhart Kößler) Brandes & Apsel, Frankfurt, 2017,  .

References

1950 births
Namibian people of German descent
White Namibian people
Living people
Namibian independence activists
People from Esslingen am Neckar